The Birjia language, also known as Binjhia or Bijori, is a language of India.  It is commonly assumed to be a Munda language closely related to the Asuri language.  However, Anderson, based on Prasad (1961:314), suggests that Birjia (Binjhia) may be an Indo-Aryan language, although the Birjia are a tribe of the Asuri nation. The latter include the Asur and the Agariya.

Distribution
Birjia is spoken in:
Jharkhand: Lohardaga district and Ranchi district
West Bengal: Darjeeling district and Jalpaiguri district
Madhya Pradesh
Odisha

References

Munda languages